The 2013–14 Second League (known as the Spor Toto 2. Lig for sponsorship reasons) is the third level in the Turkish football. The season began on 8 September 2013 and will end on 11 May 2014. In end of the 2013-2014 season, 4 teams (2 teams in each group) relegate to TFF Third League and 6 teams promote from TFF Third League.

Teams

White Group League table

Top goalscorers

Red Group League table

Top goalscorers

Promotion playoffs

Quarterfinals

First legs

Second legs

Semifinals

First legs

Second legs

Final

References

External links
TFF 2.LIG

TFF Second League seasons
3
Turkey